There are around 112 villages in Shevgaon tehsil of Ahmednagar district of state of Maharashtra. Following is the list of village in Shevgaon tehsil.

A
 Adhodi
 Akhatwade
 Akhegaon Titarfa
 Amrapur
 Antarwali Bk
 Antarwali Khurd she
 Avhane Bk
 Avhane Kd
 Aapegaon

B
BhaviNimgaon
 Bodhegaon  
 Balamtakali
 Belgaon
Baktarpur
 Bodkhe
 Badgahavan
 Bhatkudgaon
 Bhagur

C
 Chapadgaon
 Chedechandga

D
 Dadegaon
 Dahifal New
 Dahifal Old
 Dahigaon Ne
 Dahigaon She
 Deotakli
 Dhorjagaon She 
 Dhorjalgaon Ne
 Dhorsade 
 Divate
 Dhumagad Tanda
 Dhorhingani

E
 Erandgaon

G
 Gadewadi
 Gaikwadjalgaon
 Ghotan
 Golegaon
 Garadwadi

H
 Hasanapur
 Hatgaon
 Hingangaon Ne

J
 Joharpur

K
 Karhetakali
 Khadaka
 Khamgaon
 Khampimpri New
 Khampimpri 
Old
 Khanapur
 Kharadgaon
 Khuntephal
 Kol gaon
 Konoshi
 Kurudgaon

L
 Ladjalgaon
 Lakhamapuri
 Lolegaon
 Lakhephal

M
 Maalegaon Ne
 Madake
 Majaleshahar
 Malegaon She
 Mangrul Bk
 Mangrul Kd
 Mungi
 Malkapur

N
 Nagalwadi Tanda
 Nagalwadi
 Najik Babhulgaon 
 Nimbe
 Nandurvihire

P
 Pingewadi
 Prabhuwadgaon

R
 Ranegaon
 Ranjani
 Rakshi

S
 Salwadgaon
 Samangaon
 Shahartkali
 Shekte Bk
 Shekte Kd
 Shevgaon
 Shingori
 Sonesangavi
 Sonvihir
 Sukali
 Sultanpur Bk
 Sultanpur Kd
 Shobhanagar
 Sevanagar
 Sule pimpalgaon
 Sahapur
 Sahajanpur

T
 Tajnapur
 Talni
 Thakurnimgaon
 Thakurpimpalgaon
 Thate

V
 Vijaipur

W
 Wadgaon
 Wadule Bk
 Wadule Kd
 Wagholi
 Warkhed
 Warur Bk 
 Warur Kd

See also

 Shevgaon tehsil
 Tehsils in Ahmednagar
 Villages in Akole tehsil
 Villages in Jamkhed tehsil
 Villages in Karjat tehsil
 Villages in Kopargaon tehsil
 Villages in Nagar tehsil
 Villages in Nevasa tehsil
 Villages in Parner tehsil
 Villages in Pathardi tehsil
 Villages in Rahata tehsil
 Villages in Rahuri tehsil
 Villages in Sangamner tehsil
 Villages in Shrigonda tehsil
 Villages in Shrirampur tehsil

References

 
Shevgaon